Lazy Afternoon Among the Crocodiles is an album that experimental music and classical minimalism pioneer Terry Riley, and contrabassist Stefano Scodanibbio, recorded in 1997.

Track listing
 "Lazy Afternoon Among the Crocodiles" – 5:53
 "En la Siesta el Gladiator" - 4:53
 "Orfeo" - 15:40

References

1997 albums